Tackle Hunger: Home of the Souper Bowl of Caring is uniting all communities to Tackle Hunger using their programs such as the Tackle Hunger Map, the Tackle Hunger Challenge, and the annual Souper Bowl of Caring event. Tackle Hunger uses a digital platform to support food charities and encourage communities to raise funds and food donations for local food charities across the nation.

Started in 1990 at Spring Valley Presbyterian Church in Columbia, South Carolina, Tackle Hunger has branched out to include schools, businesses and congregations of all faiths. Together, they have raised more than $170 million in monetary and food donations. In 2020, thousands of groups collected over $10.6 million of food and contributions.

History 
The Souper Bowl of Caring began in 1990 with a simple prayer said by Reverend Brad Smith at Spring Valley Presbyterian Church in Columbia, South Carolina:

22 churches raised $5,700 in the first year. The number of groups involved has steadily grown each year, and so has the amount raised and put back into the communities. As the Souper Bowl of Caring programs have grown over the years to cover more than one annual event, the name and logo changed to reflect the growth. The name currently used is Tackle Hunger: Home of the Souper Bowl of Caring or shortened to Tackle Hunger.

Tackle Hunger Map 
In 2020, in the midst of COVID-19 food shortages the question was asked: how do we know the real time need of food charities? Tackle Hunger worked with Dell Technologies and the Department of Defense and Northern Command and created the Tackle Hunger Map. Powered by artificial intelligence and donations, the Tackle Hunger Map is an equitable nationwide database of the real time needs of food charities across the country. 

Using the color-coded Tackle Hunger Map, communities can quickly respond to the immediate needs of food charities in their communities.

Regardless of size, the Tackle Hunger Map features all food charities in an equitable fashion: if they are feeding people, they can go on the Tackle Hunger Map. Because the Tackle Hunger Map uses geolocation, anyone visiting the map can support their closest food charity.

Souper Bowl of Caring 
The annual Souper Bowl of Caring event harnesses the energy of the Big Game. Its vision is to transform the Big Game into a nationwide movement inspiring people to give locally and make a collective impact on hunger. People collect monetary and food donations traditionally during the weeks leading up to and after Super Bowl Sunday. All of the money and food is then given directly to local charities of the group's choice.

People come together to volunteer with and donate to local charities. This gives the participants an understanding of the complexities of hunger and poverty in our country and around the world. Some communities sponsor local events to raise awareness, others get their youth group or club involved with a soup kitchen to have a hands-on experience.

The Souper Bowl of Caring has gained national attention, securing partnerships with NFL Teams, the NFL Alumni, in addition to finding National Advocates in former President and Mrs. George H. W. Bush and former President and Mrs. Jimmy Carter.

Tackle Hunger Challenge 
The Tackle Hunger Challenge was launched in Autumn of 2021. Tackle Hunger recognizes that every day is game day when tackling hunger. Partnering with the NFL Alumni, the Tackle Hunger Challenge asks: what if everyone watching a game donates just $1 or 1 can of food to a local food charity? It would be a gamechanger! Using the energy of any sporting event at any time of the year, donations can create thousands of meals for hungry families.

Tackle Hunger Ambassadors 
While Tackle Hunger is led by adults and youth on the Board of Directors, the basis of the organization is its connection with people serving their communities. Therefore, in 2022, the Tackle Hunger Ambassador program was created. This program replaces the Youth Advisory Board (YAB) from previous years.  Tackle Hunger Ambassadors are volunteers of any age in any state who take on a leadership role in the continue success of Tackle Hunger.  Tackle Hunger Ambassadors lead and advise their respective communities, fundraise, assist in Tackle Hunger projects, and provide ideas and suggestions and represent Tackle Hunger in a positive manner. Additionally, they attend meetings to prepare for upcoming service events and projects.

References

See also 

 
 https://www.dailytrib.com/2020/01/22/everyone-wins-by-participating-in-souper-bowl-of-caring/
 
 
 
 
 

Advocacy groups in the United States
Charities based in Texas
Organizations established in 1990
1990 establishments in South Carolina